Potamogeton tepperi is a water herb, belonging to the Potamogetonaceae family in the order Alismatales.

Taxonomy
The species was first described in 1887 by the British botanist, Arthur Bennett, from a specimen collected by Frederick Manson Bailey from a pool 500 miles north of Brisbane, and another collected from a river in South Australia by Johann Gottlieb Otto Tepper (who is honoured in the species epithet).

Description 
It is an aquatic, rhizomatous perennial herb which has both submerged and floating leaves. The stems are terete and up to 3 m long. Stipules convolute, free from base of leaf blade. Both submerged leaves and floating leaves are petiolate with lanceolate blades. The Inflorescence is a terminal spike up to 5 cm long which emerges above the water. The peduncles are erect, and recurved when fruiting. The fruit is reddish, brownish or green and keeled with a prominent beak. It flowers and fruits in the dry season.

Distribution & habitat 
In Australia it has been found in Western Australia, South Australia, and Queensland, in warm and permanent waters.

References

External links
Potamogeton tepperi: images & occurrence data from GBIF

tepperi
Flora of Western Australia